Walter J. Gray is an American politician who served as a member of the Rhode Island Senate who represented the 6th Senate district which encompassed South Kingstown and New Shoreham, and briefly encompassing Exeter until it was redistricted to the 41st Senate district in 1992. Gray served from 1991 to 1995.

Political career 
Gray was elected to the South Kingstown Town Council in 1971 and re-elected in 1973. He served until 1975.

Gray was first elected to serve as a Senator in 1990, running as the Democratic nominee, defeating incumbent Senator Robert Goldberg in the November 6, 1990 General Election, with 3,672 votes (50.8%) to Goldberg's 3,551 votes (49.2%). Gray was reelected in 1992, running unopposed in the November 6, 1992 General Election, winning 4,809 votes. Gray did not run for reelection in 1994, and was succeeded by Edward F. Holland.

Gray served as a member of the Judiciary Committee, the Labor Committee, and the Joint Committee on Environmental and Energy.

Personal life 
Gray attended Boston University and graduated with Bachelor of Science.

Gray worked at the University of Rhode Island for 30 years, where he worked as the Director of Division of Marine Resources. He won the award for Administrative Excellence in 1978.

Gray has two children.

References 

Democratic Party Rhode Island state senators
20th-century American politicians
People from South Kingstown, Rhode Island
Living people
Year of birth missing (living people)